There are over 9,000 Grade I listed buildings in England. This page is a list of these buildings in the district of Lincoln in Lincolnshire.

Lincoln

|}

See also
Grade II* listed buildings in Lincoln

Notes

External links

Lists of Grade I listed buildings in Lincolnshire